The British Sports Journalism Awards are given annually in a number of categories. The category "Young Sports Writer of the Year" is part of the awards for sports writing and has been awarded since 2007. There was no shortlist in 2018.

Young Sports Writer of the Year Winners 

 2018: Daniel Matthews, The Daily Mail and MailOnline
 2017: Adam Crafton, The Daily Mail and MailOnline
 2016: Sam Dean, The Daily Telegraph
 2015: Daniel Johnson, The Daily Telegraph
 2014: James Gheerbrant, The Times and BBC
 2013: Jack Pitt-Brooke, The Independent
 2012: Martha Kelner, The Mail on Sunday
 2011: Jonathan Liew, The Daily Telegraph
 2010: Oliver Brown, The Daily Telegraph
 2009: Oliver Brown, The Daily Telegraph
 2008: Emma John, Observer Sport Monthly
 2007: Oliver Brown, The Daily Telegraph

References 

British journalism awards